A currency strap, currency band or bill strap is a simple paper device designed to hold a specific denomination and number of banknotes.  It can also refer to the bundle itself.

In the United States, the American Bankers Association (ABA) has a standard for both value and color.  Note that all bills greater than $2 only come in straps of 100 count.  The colors allow for quick accounting, even when the bills are stacked, such as in a vault. Special striping bands are used for straps containing star notes.

History

Bundling money together with a simple elastic or paper device is as old as paper currency itself.  However, measured and standardized straps are a relatively new idea.  For example, until the mid-1970s, The US Federal Reserve counted bills by hand.  That is, they employed 55 currency counters whose job it was to count as well as, by touch and feel, authenticate bills. However, as the amount of currency in circulation increased, they found that they needed a more efficient way to count currency.  To help the Currency Counting staff keep up, the Bank began strap-sorting the $1 to $20 notes. Straps were visually inspected and weighed against a counterweight equal to the paper mass of 100 genuine U.S. notes. Currency straps have even helped catch the culprits in bank robberies, like the Dunbar Armored Robbery in 1997, after one of the culprits decided to pay a real estate broker with a still-strapped bundle of notes.

ABA Standard (United States)

As shown in the above table, there are 100 bills in each strap but only 10 straps in each bundle.

See also

Currency packaging
Currency-counting machine

References

Banknotes
Numismatic terminology